Buechner & Orth was a St. Paul, Minnesota-based architectural firm that designed buildings in Minnesota and surrounding states, including 13 courthouses in North Dakota.  It was the subject of a 1979 historic resources study.

Charles W. Buechner, the founding partner, was born in Germany in 1859.  He emigrated to the United States in 1874 and worked for a time at the Northern Pacific Railway as a surveyor and civil engineer, eventually becoming the Superintendent of Tracks, Buildings and Bridges.  He left the Northern Pacific and studied architecture under noted Minnesota architect Clarence H. Johnston Sr.  In 1892, he founded the firm Buechner & Jacobson with partner John H. Jacobson.  They designed at least three Minnesota courthouses in the popular Richardsonian Romanesque style.

In 1902, John Jacobson died, so Buechner formed a new partnership with Henry W. Orth, a recent Norwegian immigrant.  They designed the Pierce County Courthouse in the Neoclassical Revival style popularized by the World's Columbian Exposition of 1893.  In the next 25 years, they designed at least 19 other courthouses in this style.

Works

Minnesota
Douglas County Courthouse (Minnesota)
Jackson County Courthouse (Minnesota)
Kanabec County Courthouse, by predecessor firm Buechner & Jacobson
Lac qui Parle County Courthouse, Buechner & Jacobson
Madison City Hall
Otter Tail County Courthouse
Ramsey County Poor Farm Barn
Swift County Courthouse, Buechner & Jacobson
Wilkin County Courthouse

Montana
First National Bank of Glasgow

North Dakota
Grand Forks County Courthouse, NRHP-listed
Dickey County Courthouse
Divide County Courthouse
Fargo Theatre
Foster County Courthouse
LaMoure County Courthouse
McHenry County Courthouse
McIntosh County Courthouse (North Dakota)
Mountrail County Courthouse
Pembina County Courthouse
Pierce County Courthouse (North Dakota)
Richland County Courthouse (North Dakota)
Sargent County Courthouse
Traill County Courthouse
St. Alexius Hospital, Bismarck, 1914 Building
St. Alexius Hospital, Bismarck, Nurses Home
VCSU Vangstad Auditorium?, Valley City, 1907 Building (Not Certain, But Likely Due To Detailing Very Similar To Known Work)

South Dakota
Deuel County Courthouse and Jail
McPherson County Courthouse (South Dakota)
Roberts County Courthouse (South Dakota)

Wisconsin
Pierce County Courthouse (Wisconsin)
West Bay Club (Sand Island)

References

Defunct architecture firms based in Minnesota